The Kingdom of Niumi, also known as the Kingdom of Barra, was a West African nation at the Gambia River. Niumi was located at the mouth of the river, and extended nearly  along and north of its north bank. For much of its existence, its eastern border was occupied by the Kingdom of Baddibu, and its northern border was open savanna leading to Senegal. Formally becoming part of the Gambia Colony and Protectorate in 1897, the Kingdom now forms the Upper Niumi and Lower Niumi districts of the North Bank Division in The Gambia.

Etymology and terminology 
The first written record of the name ‘Niumi’ was in 1455/1456 by Venetian explorer Alvise Cadamosto, who recorded ‘Gnumimenssa’, or in other words ‘Niumi Mansa’ or King of Niumi. In Diogo Gomes’s voyage, the name ‘Nomyans’ is recorded. In old French writings, the ‘Ny’ is written as ‘Gn’, for instance with ‘Gnomy’ on Delisle's map of 1726. Locally, inhabitants refer to two areas – Niumi Bato and Niumi Banta – the seaside and upland areas of Niumi respectively. According to sociologist David P. Gamble, Niumi is pronounced Nyoomi, with a long ‘O’, and was written this way by linguist Gordon Innes. Some people also pronounce it Nyuumi, with a ‘U’ sound. In government publications it is written as ‘Niumi’.

From the 17th century to the 1890s, the kingdom was also referred to as ‘Barra’. Barra was the first port on the north bank of the Gambia River. The name likely derives from the Portuguese term for a harbor entrance, but may also originate from the word ‘bar’ (French: barre), as a bar of shifting sand was characteristic to other river mouths in the region, such as in Senegal. When the Protectorate was established in 1897, the word ‘Niumi’ came back into use.

History

Early history 
The earliest inhabitants of Niumi were likely shellfish gatherers and fishermen on the coast, possibly related to the modern-day Serer. Gradually, Mandinka settlers moved into the area, establishing villages on the seafront and river banks. The Jamme clan from Badibu founded first the town of Bakendik, and then later the  town of Sitanunku. The first rulers of Niumi were said to be Queens, but the first King was Samake Jamme. It is said that Samake took over after travelling with a group of other Mandinka rulers from the Gambia to the Emperor of Mali to seek legitimacy for their rule.

In early history, a substantial salt trade began with the interior. The rulers of the towns of Siin and Saalum gained great wealth from this trade. The kingdom also possessed large numbers of canoes for trade with the interior and the transport of warriors. Early Mandinka states, such as Niumi, were expected to pay tribute to the nearby Serer and Wolof states. The next clan that settled in Niumi was a warrior family from Kaabu in the south, with the surname ‘Maane’. The Maane had conquered indigenous people on the south bank of the Gambia River, and settled at the town of Brufut. However, some travelled across the river, likely to help the Jamme fight off Serer and Wolof aggressors. The Maane shared the kingship with the Jamme and founded towns of Kanuma and Bunyadu.

Finally, the third major clan arrived, called the ‘Sonko’. The origin of the Sonko is unclear. One account says they were Mandinka warriors led by Amari Sonko, another that they were related to the Sonko Yabu clan who lived on the south bank in the middle of the Gambia River, and another that they were originally Fula and descended from Koli Tenguella. At first, the Sonko settled on the borders of Siin and Saalum and collected taxes for the Serer and Wolof rulers, but they later decided to help the Jamme and Maane in their struggle. They founded the towns of Berending and Jifet. The family at Jifet later split to Essau and Sika.

The seven towns of the three major clans then shared the rulership of Niumi in rotation. David P. Gamble establishes this as follows:

Dog Island 
Though there were early interactions with European traders and explorers, the first attempt to settle in Niumi came in the mid 1600s. In 1651, the Courlanders visited an island off the coast of Niumi, called Dog Island. They called the island Honde-Eylat and made a petition to the King of Niumi to work on the island. However, they later decided to build a fort further up the river at an island not in the possession of Niumi, called St Andrew's Island. In the 1660s, the English made a temporary fortification on Dog Island, renaming it Charles Island. After St Andrew's Island fell into the hands of the English in 1662, and renamed James Island, their main garrison remained on Charles Island until 1666. In 1678, a Frenchman named Ducasse established a small post on Charles Island, but he and his men were shortly after killed by the natives. Gamble relates that this was because the island was sacred to the residents of Sitanunku, one of the seven royal villages of Niumi.

Francis Moore described Dog Island as being within a musket shot of the Niumi shore in 1738, and also related that the fort there was now in ruins. Europeans became involved with the island again in the 19th century, and it was mined for stone in the late 1810s when the British founded the town of Bathurst on the opposite side of the river. An English agricultural society sought to create a settlement for liberated slaves and pensioners on Dog Island in 1831, but these settlers were chased out due to the sacred nature of the land.

19th century history 
At the beginning of the 19th century, the King of Niumi was considered "more formidable to Europeans than any other chieftain on the river." Each vessel that passed was required to pay £20.  These duties were often collected in person by the Alkaid, or Governor, of Jillifree.

Ceded Mile and Barra War 
The King of Niumi who was crowned in 1823 was Burungai Sonko. He was known to be opposed to the British. He levied considerable fees on Bathurst merchants who operated in Niumi, and in 1823 turned down a British request to install a battery of guns on the shore opposite Bathurst. Despite this, the British persisted, and under the threat of the British frigate HMS Maidstone, Burungai signed a treaty handing over the Ceded Mile to the British. A fort was immediately founded at Barra Point, called Fort Bullen, named after Commodore Charles Bullen of the Maidstone. A small portion of this was reserved at Albreda, where the French had established a factory. The agreement that Burungai signed relinquished all Niumi claims to sovereignty over the river as well as on the territory of the Ceded Mile. In return, the British agreed to pay 400 dollars a year.

The establishment of Fort Bullen served to suppress the sources of income that Niumi had previously relied on, ie the slave trade and duties levied on slave trading ships who passed into the Gambia River. They British also reduced their payments to Niumi as they deemed their merchants as being treated poorly. On 21 August 1831, two Niumi men entered Fort Bullen, drunk and with cutlasses, and demanded to be served. When the canteen keeper refused to serve them, one of them fired a musket at him but missed. The British sent a party after these two men the next day, but after they were fired on, the British were forced to retreat and abandoned Fort Bullen. This led to the beginning of the Barra War. Believing an attack on Bathurst to be imminent, the British called for help. French forces from Goree reinforced the British, who were induced into a general state of panic. However, the forces of Niumi satisfied themselves with making entrenchments at Barra Point.

Serahuli Affair 
In 1840, the King of Niumi, Demba Sonko, hired a force of 700 Serahuli mercenaries. Their leader, Ansumana Jaju, married a daughter of Demba and sought further power for himself. However, the people turned against Ansumana and in 1856 civil war broke out. To prevent a massacre of the Serahulis, the British Governor arranged a truce and sent the force up the river to Fatatenda in order to remove them from danger.

Marabout Invasion 
After the death of Demba Sonko in 1862, there was an interregnum before his successor, Buntung Jamme, succeeded to the throne. In the kingdom on the south bank of the Gambia River, Kombo, a civil war was raging between the Soninke pagans and the Marabout Muslims. One of the Marabout chief Hamma Ba (known as Maba)'s captains, a Wolof called Amer Faal, took the opportunity of the interregnum in Niumi to invade. He overran Jokadu, forcing the local ruler to convert to Islam. Faal made his way across Niumi, and Maba, learning of this, gathered a force to follow him. The new King of Niumi took refuge in Bathurst, but the headmen of Berending and Essau prepared to make a stand against the Marabouts. They sent word to the British Governor, George Abbas Kooli D'Arcy, to ask for his aid. The Governor was determined to remain neutral, but agreed to evacuate Albreda and protect women and children at Fort Bullen.

The Niumi forces abandoned Berending and agreed to focus their forces at Essau, which had strong stockades. Berending was destroyed, however, in response to a request from D'Arcy, Maba agreed not to attack the Niumi in Essau. Maba did not wish to agitate the Governor as he relied on Bathurst for shipments of guns and ammunition. D'Arcy met with both factions to arrange peace, but the truce was soon broken. Maba captured the cattle belonging to the Niumi royal family, and on his retreat left them with Amer Faal. The people of Essau set out to recapture the cattle, but in February 1863 D'Arcy organised another truce.

The Ceded Mile was subsequently flooded with Wolof and Serer refugees from lands that Maba had devastated. They were given the site of Kanuma, that had previously been destroyed, and the town of Bantang Kiling, which was renamed Fitzgerald Town. Later the town was raided by Amer Faal, who stole their cattle. D'Arcy could not settle the dispute by negotiation, and so launched a punitive expedition against Faal's town of Tubab Kolong in July 1866. In this, he was assisted by Niumi forces from Essau. After victory in the Battle of Tubab Kolong, the Niumi forces went on to burn the primarily Muslim villages of Lamin, Albreda, Jufure, and Sika.

Geography and economy 

Niumi lay in open savanna which provided pasturage and dry sandy soil for groundnut production. Baddibu, its eastern neighbor, was one of the richest groundnut-producing areas on the Gambia River, but lacked suitable river transportation. As Niumi had one of the few stretches of river frontage on the Gambia not choked by mangrove swamps, important land and water routes intersected with the kingdom.

Niumi had a long trading history owing to its favorable geographical position. It had been a source of salt for people to the east and south-east. By the 18th century, it became a centre for the Atlantic slave trade. Slaves carrying ivory, beeswax, hides, and hold were marched down the river from Wuli and other states to the east for trade at the Niumi ports of Jillifree or Albreda. They were placed on British or French ships and bound for the West Indies. With the enforcement of the ban on the slave trade, by the 1840s trade had shifted to the export of groundnuts.

Rulers

Mansa of Niumi 
The King of Niumi was known as the 'Mansa' in Mandinka. In 1840, the British Governor of the Gambia Henry Vere Huntley estimated that the average reign of a ruler was five years. This was because the next town in line for the throne would attempt to shorten his life, and that poison would be subtly introduced into the diet of the reigning king. Excessive alcohol was often used to this end. Also, when a ruler was incompetent a regent could be appointed.

List of known rulers 
Source: Gamble, p. 29

Notes

References

Sources 

 
 
 

Countries in medieval Africa
1897 disestablishments in Africa
Countries in precolonial Africa
History of the Gambia
 
Precolonial kingdoms of the Gambia
North Bank Division